Brentford Football Club is an English professional football club based in Brentford, Hounslow, London. Between 1897 and 1920, the first team competed in the London League, Southern League and Western League. Since 1920, the first team has competed in the Football League, the Premier League and other nationally and internationally organised competitions.

The list encompasses the major honours won by Brentford, records set by the club, its managers and its players.

Club honours and best performances

Major domestic competitions

Leagues 
First Division / Premier League (level 1)

 Best performance: 5th – 1935–36

Second Division / First Division / Championship (level 2)

 Winners (1): 1934–35
Play-off winners (1): 2021

Third Division / Third Division South / Second Division / League One (level 3)

 Winners (2): 1932–33, 1991–92
 Runners-up (4): 1929–30, 1957–58, 1994–95, 2013–14

Fourth Division / Third Division / League Two (level 4)

 Winners (3): 1962–63, 1998–99, 2008–09
 Third-place promotion (1): 1971–72
 Fourth-place promotion (1): 1977–78

Cups 
FA Cup
 Best performance: Sixth round/quarter-final – 1937–38, 1945–46, 1948–49, 1988–89

Football League Cup
 Best performance: Semi-final – 2020–21

Football League Trophy
 Best performance: Finalists – 1984–85, 2000–01, 2010–11

European competitions 
Anglo-Italian Cup
 Best performance: Semi-final – 1992–93

Minor domestic competitions

Leagues 
Southern League First Division / Premier Division

 Best performance: 9th – 1905–06
Southern League Second Division
 Winners: 1900–01
United League
 Winners: 1907–08
Western League First Division / Premier Division
 Best performance: 2nd – 1904–05
London League First Division
 Best performance: 2nd – 1897–98

London League Second Division

 Best performance: 2nd – 1896–97

Cups 
Middlesex Junior Cup

 Winners (1): 1893–94

West Middlesex Cup

 Winners (1): 1894–95
London Senior Cup
 Winners (1): 1897–98
Middlesex Senior Cup
 Winners (1): 1897–98
Southern Professional Charity Cup
 Winners (1): 1908–09
Ealing Hospital Cup
Winners (1): 1910–11
London Challenge Cup
 Winners (3): 1934–35, 1964–65, 1966–67
Supporters Direct Cup
 Winners (2): 2004, 2008
Empire Exhibition Trophy
 Best performance: First round – 1938
FA Amateur Cup
 Best performance: First round – 1898–99
Southern Professional Floodlit Cup
 Best performance: Semi-final – 1955–56, 1956–57
First Alliance Cup
 Best performance: First round – 1988

Kent Challenge Cup

 Best performance: Runners-up – 1975–76

Player records

Appearances
 Youngest debutant (all competitions): Paul Walker – 15 years, 7 months, 28 days (versus Watford, Football League Cup first round, August 1976)
 Youngest debutant (Football League): Danis Salman – 15 years, 8 months, 3 days (versus Watford, Fourth Division, 15 November 1975)
Oldest player: Jimmy Hodson – 40 years, 8 months, 2 days (versus Plymouth Argyle, Third Division, 7 May 1921)
 Oldest debutant: Simon Royce – 39 years, 4 months, 20 days (versus Yeovil Town, League One, 29 January 2011)
 Oldest player to make Football League debut with the club: Javi Venta – 37 years, 8 months, 4 days (versus Gillingham, League One, 17 August 2013)
 Most consecutive appearances: 187 – Gerry Cakebread (1 November 1958 – 18 August 1962)
 Most consecutive Football League appearances: 168 – Gerry Cakebread (1 November 1958 – 18 August 1962)
 Most consecutive FA Cup appearance: 30 – Ken Coote (9 January 1954 – 16 November 1963)
 Most appearances in a season (all competitions): 62 – Terry Evans (1988–89)
 Most Southern League appearances: 206 – Jimmy Jay
Most appearances by a player born outside the British Isles (all competitions): 246 – Toumani Diagouraga
Most Football League appearances by a player born outside the British Isles: 210 – Toumani Diagouraga
 Most seasons in which made at least one first team appearance (all competitions): 16 – Kevin O'Connor
 Most seasons in which made at least one Football League appearance: 15 – Kevin O'Connor

Most appearances

Goalscoring

League

Southern League 

 Most Southern League goals: 58 – Geordie Reid
Most goals in a Southern League season: 21 – Adam Bowman (First Division, 1907–08), Geordie Reid (First Division, 1910–11)
Most goals in a Southern League match: 5
C. Ward (versus Wycombe Wanderers, Second Division, 15 October 1898)
Peter Turnbull (versus Southall, Second Division, 19 January 1901)

Football League 

Most Football League goals: 153 – Jim Towers
Most goals in a Football League season: 38 – Jack Holliday (Third Division South, 1932–33)
Most Football League top-tier goals: 85 – David McCulloch
Most Football League second-tier goals: 63 – Billy Dare
Most Football League third-tier goals: 153 – Jim Towers
 Most Football League fourth-tier goals: 64 – Roger Cross
Most players with 20 or more Football League goals in a single season: 3 – John Dick (23), Johnny Brooks (22), Billy McAdams (22) (Fourth Division, 1962–63)
 Most goals in a Football League match: 5
 Jack Holliday (versus Luton Town, Third Division South, 28 January 1933)
Billy Scott (versus Barnsley, Second Division, 15 December 1934)
Peter McKennan (versus Bury, Second Division, 19 February 1949)
Youngest Football League goalscorer: Richard Poole – 16 years, 9 months, 17 days (versus Bradford City, Fourth Division, 20 April 1974)
Oldest Football League goalscorer: Frank Broome – 38 years, 2 months, 9 days (versus Stoke City, Second Division, 19 August 1953)
Quickest Football League goalscorer: 10 seconds – George Stobbart (versus Aldershot, Third Division South, 6 November 1954)
Most own goals in Football League matches: 5 – Peter Gelson, Alan Nelmes

Cup 

Most cup goals in a season: 14 – Dean Holdsworth (1991–92)
Most FA Cup goals: 22 – Billy Scott
Most FA Cup goals in a season (including qualifying rounds): 8 – Tommy Shanks (1902–03)
Most FA Cup goals in a season: 6 – Gerry McAloon (1945–46)

 Most Football League Cup goals: 9
 Gary Blissett
 Marcus Forss

Most Football League Cup goals in a season: 6 – Dean Holdsworth (1991–92)
Most goals in a Football League Cup match: 4 – Marcus Forss (versus Oldham Athletic, third round, 21 September 2021)
Most Football League Trophy goals: 9 – Dean Holdsworth
Most Football League Trophy goals in a season: 5 – Gary Roberts (1984–85)
Most goals in a Football League Trophy match: 4
Robbie Cooke (versus Orient, southern area preliminary round, 15 December 1986)
Mike Grella (versus Bournemouth, southern area quarter-final, 8 November 2011)
 Youngest FA Cup goalscorer: Gary Rolph – 16 years, 9 months, 26 days (versus Colchester United, second round, 20 December 1976)

Hat-tricks 

Most hat-tricks (all competitions): 9 – Jack Holliday
Most hat-tricks in a Southern League season: 3 – Geordie Reid (First Division, 1910–11)
 Most hat-tricks in a Football League season: 5 – Jack Holliday (Third Division South, 1932–33)
 Fastest hat-trick (all competitions): 3 minutes – Gary Roberts (versus Newport County, Football League Trophy southern area final, 17 May 1985)
 Fastest Football League hat-trick: 7 minutes – Carl Asaba (versus Shrewsbury Town, Second Division, 31 August 1996)
 Youngest hat-trick scorer: Jordan Rhodes – 18 years 11 months, 26 days (versus Shrewsbury Town, League Two, 31 January 2009)
Hat-trick scored on club debut: Andy Woon (versus Port Vale, Third Division, 10 February 1973)
First hat-trick scored by a substitute: Bryan Mbeumo (versus Port Vale, FA Cup third round, 8 January 2022)

Penalties 

 Most penalties (all competitions): 22 – Ivan Toney (19 league, 1 FA Cup, 2 play-offs)
 Most consecutive penalties scored (all competitions): 22 – Ivan Toney (19 league, 1 FA Cup, 2 play-offs)
 Most penalties in a season (all competitions): 11 – Ivan Toney, 2020–21 (9 league, 2 play-offs)
 Most penalties in a Southern League season: 5 – Fred Pentland (First Division, 1906–07)
 Most penalties in a Football League season: 9 – Ivan Toney (Championship, 2020–21)

Other 

 Fewest appearances required to reach 50 goals (all competitions): 49 – Jack Holliday
 Quickest goalscorer on debut: 4 minutes – Lee Luscombe (versus Barnet, Football League Trophy preliminary round, 17 December 1991)
 Most consecutive matches scored in: 10 – Fred Monk (3 February – 31 March 1951)
 Most goals in a London League match: 6 – Oakey Field (versus Leyton, First Division, 8 January 1898)
 Most goals scored in a season without scoring a league goal: 6 – Marcus Forss (2021–22)
Goalkeepers who have scored for Brentford:
Archie Ling (penalty versus Swindon Town, Southern League First Division, 10 September 1910 and penalty versus Bristol Rovers, Southern League First Division, 17 September 1910)
Willie McIver (two penalties versus Millwall, Southern League First Division, 3 April 1909)

Top goalscorers

Golden Boot

Football League 
 Top-scorer in all competitions amongst Football League clubs:
 Steve Phillips – 36 goals (1977–78)
 Level 2:
Ivan Toney – 31 goals (2020–21, Championship)
Level 3:
 Jim Towers – 32 goals (1958–59, Third Division)
 Dean Holdsworth – 24 goals (1991–92, Third Division, tied with Iwan Roberts)
 Level 4:
 Steve Phillips – 32 goals (1977–78, Fourth Division, tied with Alan Curtis)

Football League Cup 

 Dean Holdsworth – 6 goals (1991–92)
 Marcus Forss – 5 goals (2021–22, tied with Eddie Nketiah)

Discipline 
 First red card: Freddy Capper versus Newport County, Third Division South, 11 February 1922
 Most red cards in Football League matches: 6 – Jamie Bates
Most Brentford players sent off in a Football League match: 2
Terry Johnson and Gordon Sweetzer (versus Rochdale, Fourth Division, 6 December 1975)
Jamie Bates and Colin Lee (versus Mansfield Town, Third Division, 12 December 1987)
Jamie Bates and Stuart Cash (versus Tranmere Rovers, Third Division, 26 October 1990)
Gary Blissett and Marcus Gayle (versus Torquay United, Third Division, 14 December 1991)
Jamie Bates and Martin Grainger (versus Bristol Rovers, Second Division, 23 September 1995)
Tony Craig and Clayton Donaldson (versus Sheffield United, League One, 16 April 2013)
Longest suspension incurred by a Brentford player: 5 matches
John O'Mara (5 February – 4 March 1972)
Alan McCormack (22 October – 26 November 2016)

Other player records 
 Most clean sheets in a Football League season: 22 – Gordon Phillips (Fourth Division, 1971–72)
 First player to score a penalty on debut: Andy Sinton (versus Bury, Third Division, 14 December 1985)
 Only player to score on both debuts for the club: Gordon Sweetzer (versus Huddersfield Town, Fourth Division, 27 September 1975 and versus Reading, Third Division, 27 January 1982)
 First substitute to be utilised: Hugh McLaughlin (replaced Billy Cobb versus Oldham Athletic, Third Division, 23 October 1965)
First substitute to score in a match: Tommy Higginson (versus Millwall, Third Division, 6 November 1965)
First tactical substitute to be utilised: Eddie Reeve (replaced Keith Hooker versus Newport County, Fourth Division, 26 August 1967)
 First fourth substitute to be utilised: Justin Shaibu (replaced Neal Maupay versus AFC Wimbledon, Football League Cup first round, 8 August 2017)
 First fifth substitute to be utilised: Jan Žambůrek (replaced Christian Nørgaard versus Wigan Athletic, Championship, 4 July 2020)
First substitute to be substituted: Paul Birch (replaced Colin Lee, then replaced by Andy Feeley versus Mansfield Town, Third Division, 2 May 1988)
 Most Football League substitute appearances: 75 – Sam Saunders
 Most Football League matches in which substituted: 61 – Sam Saunders
 Most matches as an unused substitute: 182 – Tamer Fernandes
 Most separate contracted spells with the club: 3
John Docherty
Paul Priddy
 Shortest Football League career with the club: 8 minutes – Clement James
 First Brentford goal scored with the aid of goal-line technology: Andreas Bjelland (versus Nottingham Forest, Championship, 12 August 2017)
Tallest player to play in a Football League match: 6 ft 5 in
Jack Durston
Philipp Hofmann
Fola Onibuje
Shortest player to play in a Football League match: 5 ft 4 in
Hughie Reed
Billy Stagg
Most leagues in which played for the club: 4 – Patsy Hendren (Football League Third Division, Football League Third Division South, Southern League First Division, Southern League Second Division)
Last player born in the 19th century to make a competitive appearance for Brentford: Jack Clough, born 4 November 1898 (versus Bury, Second Division, 5 May 1934)
First player born in the 20th century to make a competitive appearance for Brentford: George Taylor, born 3 June 1900 (versus Bristol Rovers, Third Division, 13 November 1920)
First player born in the 21st century to make a competitive appearance for Brentford: Jan Žambůrek, born 13 February 2001 (versus Hull City, Championship, 23 February 2019)

Opposition player records 

 Most Football League starts versus Brentford: 25 – Geoff Crudgington
 Most Football League appearances versus Brentford: 31 – Steve Fletcher
 Most Football League goals versus Brentford: 12 – Harold Blackmore, Dennis Westcott

International

 First capped player: Joe Connor (for Ireland versus Scotland, 21 March 1903)
 First capped player since Brentford joined the Football League in 1920: 
Idris Hopkins (for Wales versus Scotland, 21 November 1934)
 David McCulloch (for Scotland versus Wales, 21 November 1934)
 First capped player for England: Billy Scott (versus Wales, 17 October 1936)
First capped player to score at full international level: Joe Connor (for Ireland versus Scotland, 21 March 1903)
 Most caps won while contracted to the club: 22 – Henrik Dalsgaard (Denmark)
First contracted Brentford player to make an appearance at a major international tournament: Henrik Dalsgaard (Denmark, 2018 World Cup)
Capped players who failed to make a first team appearance for the club:
Kolbeinn Finnsson (Iceland)
Daniel O'Shaughnessy (Finland)

Transfers

Record paid

Record received

Other records 

 Record fee paid for a goalkeeper: £1,100,000 (Daniel Bentley from Southend United, 1 July 2016)
 Record fee received for a goalkeeper: £2,000,000 (Daniel Bentley to Bristol City, 28 June 2019)
Record fee paid for a player over 30 years of age: £60,000 (Detzi Kruszyński from Wimbledon, August 1992)
Record fee received for a player over 30 years of age: £2,000,000 (Lasse Vibe to Changchun Yatai, 10 February 2018)
First player signed on loan: Dennis Edwards (from Portsmouth, September 1967)

Managerial records

Most matches

Most wins

Most points

Highest winning percentage

Lowest winning percentage

Other manager records 
 First person to win promotion with Brentford as a player and manager: Andy Scott (1998–99 Third Division as a player, 2008–09 League Two as manager)

Club records

Matches

Firsts
 First match: 1–1 versus Kew, friendly, 23 November 1889
 First London League match: 6–1 versus Fulham, Second Division, 3 October 1896
 First FA Cup match: 6–1 versus 1st Coldstream Guards, first qualifying round, 25 September 1897
 First Southern League match: 6–1 versus St Albans, Second Division, 10 September 1898
 First Football League match: 0–3 versus Exeter City, Third Division South, 28 August 1920
First Football League match played at neutral ground: 0–3 versus Clapton Orient, Third Division South, Wembley Stadium, 22 November 1930
 First match at Griffin Park: versus Plymouth Argyle, Western League First Division, 1 September 1904
First competitive floodlit match at Griffin Park: versus Swindon Town, Third Division South, 12 March 1956
 First Football League Cup match: 4–3 versus Sunderland, second round, 25 October 1960
 First Football League Trophy match: 4–3 versus Leyton Orient, first round, 21 February 1984
First Football League play-offs match: 2–2 versus Tranmere Rovers, Third Division, 19 May 1991
First Anglo-Italian Cup match: 2–1 versus Swindon Town, preliminary round, 16 September 1992

Record wins
 Record London League win: 9–1 versus Bromley, First Division, 7 April 1898
 Record Southern League win: 11–1 versus Wycombe Wanderers, Second Division, 16 February 1901
Record Southern League away win: 9–1 versus Southall, Second Division, 19 January 1901
 Record Football League win: 9–0 versus Wrexham, Third Division, 15 October 1963
 Record Football League away win:
 6–0 versus Southampton, Third Division, 9 March 1959
 7–1 versus Exeter City, Third Division, 23 April 1983
 Record FA Cup win: 8–0 versus Uxbridge, third qualifying round, 31 October 1903
 Record FA Cup away win: 6–1 vs Ilford, first round, 29 November 1930
Record Football League Cup win:
7–0 versus Oldham Athletic, third round, 21 September 2021
 Record Football League Trophy win:
6–0 versus Newport County, semi-final, 17 May 1985
6–0 versus Bournemouth, southern area quarter-final, 8 November 2011

Highest-scoring draws 
 Highest scoring Southern League draw: 3–3 on four occasions
Highest scoring Football League draw: 5–5 versus Luton Town, Third Division South, 1 February 1933
 Highest scoring home Football League draw: 3–3 on 22 occasions, most recently versus Milton Keynes Dons, League One, 31 December 2011
 Highest scoring away Football League draw: 5–5 versus Luton Town, Third Division South, 1 February 1933
Highest scoring draw (all competitions): 6–6 after extra time versus Dagenham & Redbridge, Football League Cup first round, 12 August 2014

Record defeats
 Record London League defeat: 1–3 versus Queens Park Rangers, Second Division, 22 April 1897
 Record Southern League defeat: 0–9 versus Coventry City, First Division, 27 December 1911
Record Southern League home defeat:
0–5 versus Grays United, Second Division, 8 February 1900
0–5 versus Portsmouth, First Division, 14 February 1903
 Record Football League defeat:
 0–7 versus Swansea Town, Third Division South, 8 November 1924
 0–7 versus Walsall, Third Division South, 19 January 1957
 0–7 versus Peterborough United, League Two, 24 November 2007
 Record Football League home defeat:
 1–6 versus Brighton & Hove Albion, Third Division South, 12 September 1925
 0–5 versus Bristol Rovers, Third Division, 5 February 1966
 Record FA Cup defeat: 1–7 versus Manchester United, third round, 14 January 1928
 Record FA Cup defeat to non-league opposition (since 1920):
 3–1 versus Kingstonian (first round, 18 November 2000)
 5–3 versus St Albans (fifth qualifying round, 29 November 1924)
 Record Football League Cup defeat:
 0–5 versus Charlton Athletic, first round, second leg, 12 August 1980
 0–5 versus Cheltenham Town, first round, 23 August 2005
 0–5 versus Derby County, second round, 27 August 2013
 Record Football League Trophy defeat: 0–4 versus Wycombe Wanderers, southern area first round, 19 January 1988

Other 

 Most matches in a Football League season: 63 – 1988–89 (46 Third Division, 8 FA Cup, 4 Football League Cup, 5 Football League Trophy)

Sequences

Wins 
 Consecutive Southern League wins: 9 (13 September 1913 – 20 December 1913)
Consecutive home Southern League wins: 7 (10 November 1900 – 9 April 1901)
Consecutive away Southern League wins: 4 (13 September 1913 – 20 December 1913)
Consecutive Football League wins: 9 (30 April – 24 September 1932)
 Consecutive Football League wins in a single season: 8
 26 November 2013 – 11 January 2014
 7 March – 15 July 2020
 Consecutive home Football League wins: 21 (31 August 1929 – 21 April 1930)
 Consecutive away Football League wins: 5
 21 April – 29 August 1956
 24 October – 28 December 1981
 20 April – 24 August 1991
 16 October – 11 December 2010

Draws 
 Consecutive Southern League draws: 3
24 February 1900 – 17 March 1900
11 February 1905 – 25 February 1905
4 November 1905 – 18 November 1905
22 February 1913 – 5 March 1913
20 September 1919 – 27 September 1919
 Consecutive home Southern League draws: 3
 14 October 1911 – 11 November 1911
 25 December 1914 – 30 January 1915
 27 September 1919 – 1 November 1919
 Consecutive away Southern League draws: 3 (24 November 1906 – 22 December 1906)
Consecutive Football League draws: 5 (16 March – 6 April 1957)
 Consecutive home Football League draws: 4
 10 January – 28 February 1925
 2 – 30 April 1927
 25 December 1931 – 30 January 1932
 3 – 22 April 1953
 11 April – 25 March 1961
 26 February – 2 April 1994
 21 December 1996 – 8 February 1997
 Consecutive away Football League draws: 6 (27 December 1980 – 7 March 1981)

Defeats 
 Consecutive Southern League defeats: 11 (19 April 1902 – 8 November 1902)
Consecutive Southern League defeats in a single season: 9 (6 September – 8 November 1902)
Consecutive Southern League home defeats: 5 (6 December 1902 – 24 January 1903)
Consecutive Southern League away defeats: 18 (19 April 1902 – 5 September 1903)
Consecutive Southern League away defeats in a single season: 15 (6 September 1902 – 18 April 1903)
Consecutive Football League defeats: 9
 13 April – 12 September 1925
 20 October – 25 December 1928
 Consecutive home Football League defeats: 6
 25 April – 26 September 1925
 9 January – 20 March 1993
 Consecutive away Football League defeats: 15 (16 September 1972 – 10 March 1973)

Without defeat 
 Most Southern League matches without defeat: 21 (21 April 1900 – 7 September 1901)
Most home Southern League matches without defeat: 22 (22 January 1910 – 11 February 1911)
Most away Southern League matches without defeat: 10 (30 April 1900 – 7 September 1901)
Best-ever run of Southern League results: 18 wins, 4 draws (21 April 1900 – 7 September 1901)
Most Football League matches without defeat: 26 (20 February – 16 October 1999)
 Most home Football League matches without defeat: 29 (20 January 1996 – 4 March 1997)
 Most away Football League matches without defeat: 12 (20 February – 2 October 1999)
 Best-ever run of Football League results: 16 wins, 3 draws (19 October 2013 – 22 February 2014)

Without a win 
 Most Southern League matches without a win: 11
19 April – 8 November 1902
6 December 1902 – 21 February 1903
Most home Southern League matches without a win: 7 (6 December 1902 – 14 February 1903)
Most away Southern League matches without a win: 35 (7 September 1901 – 17 October 1903)
Most Football League matches without a win: 18 (9 September – 26 December 2006)
 Most home Football League matches without a win: 13 (5 February – 16 September 2000)
 Most away Football League matches without a win: 21
 24 April 1965 – 16 April 1966
 22 April 1997 – 3 March 1998
 Most away Southern League matches without a win: 35 (30 March 1901 – 7 November 1903)

Without a draw 
 Most Southern League matches without a draw: 20
20 April 1912 – 21 December 1912
8 March 1913 – 20 December 1913
Most home Southern League matches without a draw: 19
18 January 1902 – 31 January 1903
4 January 1913 – 11 April 1914
Most away Southern League matches without a draw: 19 (19 April 1902 – 19 September 1903)
Most Football League matches without a draw: 27 (2 May 1998 – 30 January 1999)
 Most home Football League matches without a draw: 25 (27 April 1929 – 17 September 1930)
 Most away Football League matches without a draw: 44 (25 August 1923 – 5 September 1925)

Scoring 
 Most Southern League matches without failing to score a goal: 13 (10 November 1900 – 7 September 1901)
Most Southern League matches without failing to score a home goal: 17 (14 February – 27 December 1910)
Most Southern League matches without failing to score an away goal: 10 (16 April 1900 – 30 March 1901)
Most Southern League matches without scoring a goal: 8 (26 March 1904 – 24 September 1904)
Most Southern League matches without scoring a home goal: 3
2 April – 1 October 1904
21 September – 9 November 1912
Most Southern League matches without scoring an away goal: 5
26 March – 24 September 1904
27 December 1911 – 2 March 1912
Most Football League matches without failing to score a goal: 26 (4 March – 14 September 1963)
 Most Football League matches without failing to score a home goal: 41 (21 August 1962 – 28 March 1964)
 Most Football League matches without failing to score an away goal: 17 (7 January – 4 November 1933)
 Most Football League matches without scoring a goal: 7 (7 March – 8 April 2000)
 Most Football League matches without scoring a home goal: 6 (30 January – 27 March 1993)
 Most Football League matches without scoring an away goal: 9 (14 October 2006 – 20 January 2007)
Most consecutive league matches in which scored three goals or more: 5 (18 October – 20 December 1913)
Most consecutive matches in which scored four goals or more (all competitions): 4 (8 January – 19 February 1898)
Most consecutive matches in which scored three goals or more (all competitions): 5 (12 January – 5 February 2019)
Most consecutive penalties scored (all competitions): 32 (28 October 2019 – 6 March 2023)

Clean sheets 
 Most consecutive Southern League clean sheets: 5
5 – 28 March 1910
26 December 1913 – 7 February 1914
 Most consecutive home Southern League clean sheets: 5
 5 April – 18 September 1912
 6 December 1911 – 1914 March 1914
Most consecutive away Southern League clean sheets: 5 (11 October 1913 – 7 February 1914)
Most Southern League games without a clean sheet: 20 (22 February – 22 November 1902)
Most home Southern League games without a clean sheet: 9
 10 September 1898 – 8 April 1899
 1 March – 22 November 1902
Most away Southern League games without a clean sheet: 33 (14 September 1901 – 7 November 1903)
Most consecutive Football League clean sheets: 9 (1 October – 9 November 1957)
 Most consecutive home Football League clean sheets: 8 (14 January – 22 April 1950)
 Most consecutive away Football League clean sheets: 4
 28 February – 13 April 1935
 25 August – 11 September 1948
 8 September – 10 October 1979
 6 September – 8 October 1980
 5 October – 22 November 1991
 2 November – 21 December 2013
 Most Football League games without a clean sheet: 20
 21 April – 10 November 1923
 25 September 1954 – 19 February 1955
 29 September 1984 – 26 January 1985
 5 February–20 August 1994
 23 September 2006 – 20 January 2007
 Most home Football League games without a clean sheet: 16 (3 March – 20 October 1956)
 Most away Football League games without a clean sheet: 34 (17 March 1928 – 26 December 1929)

League records

Southern League (1898–1920)

Wins in a season 
 Most Southern League wins in a season: 20 – 1913–14 (Second Division)
 Most Southern League home wins in a season: 14 – 1906–07 (First Division)
 Most Southern League away wins in a season: 7 – 1900–01, 1913–14 (Second Division)
 Fewest Southern League wins in a season: 2 – 1902–03 (First Division)
 Fewest Southern League home wins in a season: 2 – 1902–03 (First Division)
 Fewest Southern League away wins in a season: 0 – 1901–02, 1902–03 (First Division)

Draws in a season 
 Most Southern League draws in a season: 9 – 1904–05, 1909–10, 1910–11, 1911–12 (First Division)
 Most Southern League home draws in a season: 7 – 1904–05 (First Division)
 Most Southern League away draws in a season: 5 – 1903–04, 1906–07, 1919–20 (First Division)
 Least Southern League draws in a season: 1 – 1902–03 (First Division)
 Fewest Southern League home draws in a season: 1 – 1900–01, 1902–03 (First Division), 1912–13 (Second Division)
 Fewest Southern League away draws in a season: 0 – 1902–03 (First Division)

Defeats in a season 
 Most Southern League defeats in a season: 27 – 1902–03 (First Division)
 Most Southern League home defeats in a season: 12 – 1902–03 (First Division)
 Most Southern League away defeats in a season: 16 – 1907–08, 1912–13 (First Division)
 Fewest Southern League defeats in a season: 0 – 1900–01 (Second Division)
 Fewest Southern League home defeats in a season: 0 – 1900–01 (Second Division)
 Fewest Southern League away defeats in a season: 0 – 1900–01 (Second Division)

Football League (1920–present)

Wins in a season 
 Most Football League wins in a season: 28 – 1929–30 (Third Division South), 2013–14 (League One)
 Most Football League home wins in a season: 21 – 1929–30 (Third Division South)
 Most Football League away wins in a season: 12 – 1996–97 (Second Division)
 Fewest Football League wins in a season: 8 – 2006–07 (League One)
 Fewest Football League home wins in a season: 5 – 1946–47 (First Division), 2006–07 (League One)
 Fewest Football League away wins in a season: 1 – 1921–22, 1924–25 (Third Division South), 1953–54 (Second Division), 1964–65 (Third Division)

Draws in a season 
 Most Football League draws in a season: 19 – 1980–81 (Third Division), 1993–94 (Second Division)
 Most Football League home draws in a season: 11 – 1996–97 (Second Division)
 Most Football League away draws in a season: 10 – 1958–59, 1963–64, 1980–81 (Third Division)
 Fewest Football League draws in a season: 5 – 1929–30 (Third Division South)
 Fewest Football League home draws in a season: 0 – 1929–30 (Third Division South)
 Fewest Football League away draws in a season: 0 – 1923–24, 1924–25 (Third Division South)

Defeats in a season 
 Most Football League defeats in a season: 26 – 1924–25 (Third Division South), 1946–47 (First Division)
 Most Football League home defeats in a season: 11 – 1946–47 (First Division)
 Most Football League away defeats in a season: 20 – 1924–25 (Third Division South)
 Fewest Football League defeats in a season: 6 – 1932–33 (Third Division South)
 Fewest Football League home defeats in a season: 0 – 1929–30 (Third Division South), 1934–35 (Second Division)
 Fewest Football League away defeats in a season: 4 – 1932–33 (Third Division South)

Superior away records 
 Seasons in which the club won more points away from home than at home:
 1980–81, Third Division, 24 points won away, 23 won at home
 1981–82, Third Division, 38 points won away, 30 won at home
 1985–86, Third Division, 34 points won away, 32 won at home
 1996–97, Second Division, 39 points won away, 35 won at home
 2007–08, League Two, 33 points won away, 26 won at home

Other home/away records 
 Identical home and away records:
 1900–01, Southern League Second Division, 7 wins, 1 draw, 0 losses
 2005–06, Football League One, 10 wins, 8 draws, 5 losses

Goals

Southern League (1898–1920)

Scored in a match 

 Most goals scored in a home Southern League win: 11
 11–1 versus Wycombe Wanderers, Second Division, 16 February 1901
Most goals scored in an away Southern League win: 9
 9–1 versus Southall, Second Division, 19 January 1901

Conceded in a match 

 Most goals conceded in a home Southern League defeat: 5
 0–5 versus Grays United, Second Division, 8 February 1900
0–5 versus Portsmouth, First Division, 14 February 1903
Most goals conceded in an away Southern League defeat: 9
0–9 versus Coventry City, First Division, 27 December 1911

Scored in a season 

 Most Southern League goals scored in a season: 80 – 1913–14 (Second Division)
 Most home Southern League goals scored in a season: 52 – 1913–14 (Second Division)
 Most away Southern League goals scored in a season: 28 – 1913–14 (Second Division)
 Fewest Southern League goals scored in a season: 25 – 1902–03 (First Division)
 Fewest home Southern League goals scored in a season: 10 – 1902–03 (First Division)
 Fewest away Southern League goals scored in a season: 7 – 1899–1900 (Second Division)

Conceded in a season 

 Most Southern League goals conceded in a season: 103 – 1902–03 (First Division)
 Most home Southern League goals conceded in a season: 36 – 1902–03 (First Division)
 Most away Southern League goals conceded in a season: 67 – 1902–03 (First Division)
 Fewest Southern League goals conceded in a season: 11 – 1900–01 (Second Division)
 Fewest home Southern League goals conceded in a season: 3 – 1913–14 (Second Division)
 Fewest away Southern League goals conceded in a season: 5 – 1900–01 (Second Division)

Goal difference 

 Highest positive overall goal difference in a Southern League season: +62 – 1913–14 (Second Division)
 Highest positive home goal difference in a Southern League season: +49 – 1913–14 (Second Division)
 Highest positive away goal difference in a Southern League season: +22 – 1900–01 (Second Division)
 Highest final league placing with a negative goal difference in a Southern League season: 7th, -10 – 1914–15 (Second Division)
 Lowest negative overall goal difference in a Southern League season: -68 – 1902–03 (First Division)
 Lowest negative home goal difference in a Southern League season: -26 – 1902–03 (First Division)
 Lowest negative away goal difference in a Southern League season: -50 – 1902–03 (First Division)
 Lowest final league placing with a positive goal difference in a Southern League season: 10th, +1 – 1906–07 (First Division)

Aggregate scores 

Highest home Southern League League aggregate score: 12
 11–1 versus Wycombe Wanderers, Second Division, 16 February 1901
 Highest away Southern League aggregate score: 11
 4–7 versus West Ham United, First Division, 21 October 1911

Goalless draws 

 Most goalless draws in a Southern League season: 5 – 1909–10 (First Division)

Goalscorers 

Most goalscorers in a Southern League season (all competitions): 13 – 1913–14 (First Division)
 Most goalscorers in a Southern League match: 5
Ralph McElhaney, E. Andrews, Joe Turner, Peter Turnbull and Roddy McLeod (versus Wycombe Wanderers, Second Division, 16 February 1901)
Jack Chapman, Patsy Hendren, Tommy Clark, Joe Johnson, Bobby Jackson (versus Ton Pentre, Second Division, 4 October 1913)
 Fewest goalscorers in a Southern League season (all competitions): 7 – 1900–01 (Second Division)
Most hat-tricks in a Southern League season (all competitions): 6 – 1913–14 (First Division)

Football League (1920–present)

Scored in a match 

 Most goals scored in a home Football League win: 9
 9–0 versus Wrexham, Third Division, 15 October 1963
 Most goals scored in an away Football League win: 7
 7–1 versus Exeter City, Third Division, 23 April 1983

Conceded in a match 

 Most goals conceded in a home Football League defeat: 6
 1–6 versus Brighton & Hove Albion, Third Division South, 12 September 1925
 2–6 versus Manchester City, First Division, 3 April 1937
 2–6 versus Luton Town, Third Division, 8 February 1964
 2–6 versus Bristol Rovers, Second Division, 28 August 2000
 Most goals conceded in an away Football League defeat: 7
 1–7 versus Plymouth Argyle, Third Division South, 6 September 1924
 0–7 versus Swansea Town, Third Division South, 8 November 1924
 1–7 versus Reading, Third Division South, 1 May 1926
 2–7 versus Grimsby Town, Second Division, 11 November 1950
 0–7 versus Walsall, Third Division South, 19 January 1957
 0–7 versus Peterborough United, League Two, 24 November 2007

Scored in a season 

 Most goals scored in a season (all competitions): 107 – 1982–83 (Third Division)
 Most Football League goals scored in a season: 98 – 1962–63 (Fourth Division)
 Most home Football League goals scored in a season: 66 – 1929–30 (Third Division South)
 Most away Football League goals scored in a season: 45 – 1932–33 (Third Division South)
 Fewest Football League goals scored in a season: 38 – 1924–25 (Third Division South)
 Fewest home Football League goals scored in a season: 19 – 1946–47 (Fourth Division)
 Fewest away Football League goals scored in a season: 10 – 1924–25 (Third Division South)

Conceded in a season 

 Most Football League goals conceded in a season: 94 – 1925–26 (Third Division South)
 Most home Football League goals conceded in a season: 41 – 2006–07 (League One)
 Most away Football League goals conceded in a season: 65 – 1924–25 (Third Division South)
 Fewest Football League goals conceded in a season: 39 – 1969–70 (Fourth Division), 1994–95 (Second Division)
 Fewest home Football League goals conceded in a season: 11 – 1969–70 (Fourth Division)
 Fewest away Football League goals conceded in a season: 21 – 1996–97 (Second Division)

Goal difference 

 Highest positive overall goal difference in a Football League season: +50 – 1929–30 (Third Division South)
 Highest positive home goal difference in a Football League season: +54 – 1929–30 (Third Division South)
 Highest positive away goal difference in a Football League season: +15 – 1932–33 (Third Division South)
 Highest final league placing with a negative goal difference in a Football League season: 4th, -3 – 2004–05 (League One)
 Lowest negative overall goal difference in a Football League season: -53 – 1924–25 (Third Division South)
 Lowest negative home goal difference in a Football League season: -17 – 2006–07 (League One)
 Lowest negative away goal difference in a Football League season: -55 – 1924–35 (Third Division South)
 Lowest final league placing with a positive goal difference in a Football League season: 16th, +2 – 1963–64 (Third Division), 1993–94 (Second Division)

Aggregate scores 

 Highest home Football League aggregate score: 10
 7–3 versus Coventry City, Third Division South, 23 October 1926
 8–2 versus Crystal Palace, Third Division South, 25 December 1930
 7–3 versus Cardiff City, Third Division South, 1 April 1933
 8–2 versus Bury, Second Division, 19 February 1949
 6–4 versus York City, Fourth Division, 9 November 1970
 Highest away Football League aggregate score: 10
 5–5 versus Luton Town, Third Division South, 1 February 1933
 4–6 versus Southampton, Third Division South, 21 August 1954
 6–4 versus Crewe Alexandra, Fourth Division, 3 September 1977
 Highest Football League Cup aggregate score: 12
 6–6 after extra time versus Dagenham & Redbridge, first round, 12 August 2014

Goalless draws 

 Most goalless draws in a season (all competitions): 9 – 1997–98
 Most goalless draws in a Football League season: 8
1948–49 (Second Division)
1973–74 (Fourth Division)
1980–81 (Third Division)
1997–98 (Second Division)

Goalscorers 

 Most goalscorers in a Football League season (all competitions): 20 (League One, 2013–14)
 Most goalscorers in a Football League match: 6 – Darren Annon, Paul Smith, Robert Taylor, Nicky Forster, Denny Mundee and Lee Harvey (versus Plymouth Argyle, Second Division, 17 December 1994)
 Most goalscorers with 10 or more goals prior to Christmas Day (all competitions): 3
1930–31, Third Division South (Cecil Blakemore, Billy Lane, Jack Lane)
 1964–95, Third Division (Joe Bonson, Billy Cobb, Mark Lazarus)
 1982–83, Third Division (Francis Joseph, Gary Roberts, Tony Mahoney)
 2001–02, Second Division (Lloyd Owusu, Paul Evans, Ben Burgess)
 Fewest goalscorers in a Football League season (all competitions): 8 – 1933–34, 1947–48 (Second Division), 1958–59 (Third Division)
Most hat-tricks in a Football League season (all competitions): 8 – 1934–35 (Second Division)

Penalty shoot-out record

Clean sheets 
 Most clean sheets kept in a Southern League season: 19 – 1913–14 (Second Division)
 Fewest clean sheets kept in a Southern League season: 2 – 1902–03 (First Division)
 Most clean sheets kept in a Football League season: 22 – 1971–72 (Fourth Division), 1994–95 (Second Division)
 Fewest clean sheets kept in a Football League season: 5 – 1936–37, 1946–47 (First Division)

Points

Southern League (1898–1920) 
 Most points in a Southern League season: 44 – 1913–14 (Second Division)
 Most points per game in a Southern League season: 1.88 – 1900–01 (Second Division)
 Fewest points in a Southern League season: 5 – 1902–03 (First Division)
 Fewest points per game in a Southern League season: 0.17 – 1902–03 (First Division)
Best start to a Southern League season: 30 points from all 16 games – 1900–01 (Second Division)
Worst start to a Southern League season: 0 points from opening 9 games – 1902–03 (First Division)

Football League (1920–present) 
 Most points in a Football League season:
 2 points for a win: 62 – 1932–33 (Third Division South), 1962–63 (Fourth Division)
 3 points for a win: 94 – 2013–14 (League One)
 Most Football League points per game in a season: 2.12 – 1929–30 (Third Division South, adjusted to 3 points for a win)
 Fewest points in a Football League season:
 2 points for a win: 25 – 1924–25 (Third Division South), 1946–47 (First Division)
 3 points for a win: 37 – 2006–07 (League One)
 Fewest Football League points per game in a season: 0.6 – 1924–25 (Third Division South, adjusted to 3 points for a win), 1946–47 (First Division, adjusted to 3 points for a win)
 Best start to a Football League season: 27 points from opening 14 games – 1932–33, Third Division South
 Worst start to a Football League season: 1 point from opening 10 games – 1925–26, Third Division South

Winning percentage

Southern League (1898–1920) 

 Highest winning percentage in a Southern League season: 87.5% – 1900–01, Second Division
Highest winning percentage in a Southern League season (all competitions): 78.95% – 1900–01, Second Division
Lowest winning percentage in a Southern League season: 6.67% – 1902–03, First Division
Lowest winning percentage in a Southern League season (all competitions): 15.39% – 1902–03, First Division

Football League (1920–present) 

 Highest winning percentage in a Football League season: 66.67% – 1929–30, Third Division South
Highest winning percentage in a Football League season (all competitions): 65.12% – 1929–30, Third Division South
 Lowest winning percentage in a Football League season: 17.39% – 2006–07, League One
Lowest winning percentage in a Football League season (all competitions): 15.686% – 2006–07, League One

Attendances

Highest 
 Highest home league attendance: 38,535 versus Arsenal (First Division, 8 September 1938)
Highest home Football League second-tier attendance: 34,483 versus Cardiff City (Second Division, 18 October 1947)
Highest home Football League third-tier attendance: 28,725 versus Plymouth Argyle (Third Division, 27 March 1959)
Highest home Football League fourth-tier attendance: 18,521 versus Chester (Fourth Division, 31 March 1972)
Highest home Southern League attendance: 13,770 versus Northampton Town (First Division, 27 December 1910)
 Highest home cup attendance: 38,678 versus Leicester City (FA Cup sixth round, 26 February 1949)
 Highest home attendance prior to joining the Football League: 21,478 versus Crystal Palace (FA Cup third round replay, 27 February 1907)
 Highest home aggregate Football League attendance in a season: 541,128 (1946–47, First Division)
 Highest home average Football League attendance in a season: 25,768 (1946–47, First Division)
 Highest attendance at any Brentford match: 73,482 versus Manchester United (Premier League, 2 May 2022)

Lowest 
 Lowest home Football League attendance: 2,002 versus Walsall (Third Division, 5 December 1927)
Lowest home Football League first-tier attendance: 12,761 versus Blackpool (29 April 1939)
Lowest home Football League second-tier attendance: 6,337 versus Peterborough United (27 February 1993)
Lowest home Football League fourth-tier attendance: 3,155 versus Morecambe (4 December 2007)
 Lowest home FA Cup attendance: 1,000 versus Richmond Association (third qualifying round, 28 October 1899)
 Lowest home League Cup attendance: 2,040 versus Shrewsbury Town (first round, 12 August 1997)
 Lowest home Football League Trophy attendance: 1,100 versus Swindon Town (preliminary round, 6 January 1987)

Away 
 Highest away league attendance: 60,015 versus Arsenal (Premier League, 19 February 2022)
Highest away Football League second-tier attendance: 56,692 versus Newcastle United (6 September 1947)
Highest away Football League third-tier attendance: 33,553 versus Queens Park Rangers (2 January 1932)
Highest away Football League fourth-tier attendance: 16,544 versus Watford (25 April 1978)
Highest away FA Cup attendance: 56,190 versus Manchester City (fourth round, 23 January 1932)
 Lowest away Football League attendance: 894 versus Rochdale (Fourth Division, 27 March 1976)
Lowest away Football League first-tier attendance: 5,276 versus Grimsby Town (7 December 1935)
Lowest away Football League second-tier attendance: 3,464 versus Burton Albion (6 March 2018)
Lowest away Football League third-tier attendance: 970 versus Halifax Town (4 April 1973)
Lowest away cup attendance: 450 versus Cesena (Anglo-Italian Cup first round, 8 December 1992)

Other club records 

Longest run of matches with unchanged starting lineup: 21 (2 November 1929 – 15 March 1930)
 Longest run undefeated in home Football League matches: 29 (26 December 1995 – 15 March 1997)
 Best-ever run of results: 16 wins, 3 draws (26 November 2013 – 11 January 2014)
 Quickest time to reach 50 Football League goals in a season: 22 matches (1963–64, Third Division)
Fewest players used in a Football League season: 14 (Fourth Division, 1971–72)
Oldest-ever starting lineup: 348 years – versus Aston Villa, First Division, 1 February 1947
 Youngest-ever FA Cup starting lineup: 22 years and three months versus Gainsborough Trinity, first round, 8 November 2003
Most Scottish players named in a starting lineup: 7 – versus Oldham Athletic, Third Division, 30 November 1963 (Chic Brodie, John Dick, Tommy Higginson, George McLeod, Willie Smith, George Summers, George Thomson)
Most players called up for international duty during an international break: 18 (2–10 September 2019)
Most players capped at international level during an international break: 10 (2–10 September 2019)

Division records 
 Rankings are calculated thusly:
 Home and away records: based on the true league table
 Attacking and defensive records: based on average goals per game
 Goal difference: based on average net goals per game

Football League first tier

Worst in division 
 Worst home record: 1
 1946–47 (First Division)
 Worst home attacking record: 1
 1946–47 (First Division)
 Lowest home goal difference: 1
 1946–47 (First Division)

Football League second tier

Best in division 
 Best home record: 1
 1934–35 (Second Division)
 Best away record: 1
 1934–35 (Second Division)
 Best away attacking record: 2
 1934–35 (Second Division)
 2015–16 (Championship)
 Best overall defensive record: 1
 1934–35 (Second Division)
 Best home defensive record: 1
 1934–35 (Second Division)
 1949–50 (Second Division)
 Highest away goal difference: 1
 1934–35 (Second Division)

Worst in division 
 Worst overall attacking record: 1
 1948–49 (Second Division)
 Worst home attacking record: 1
 1953–54 (Second Division)

Football League third tier

Best in division 
 Best home record: 6
 1929–30 (Third Division South)
 1964–65 (Third Division)
 1991–92 (Third Division)
 2001–02 (Second Division)
 2012–13 (League One)
 2013–14 (League One)
 Best away record: 4
 1932–33 (Third Division South)
 1994–95 (Second Division)
 1996–97 (Second Division)
 2005–06 (League One)
 Best overall attacking record: 3
 1982–83 (Third Division)
 1991–92 (Third Division)
 2001–02 (Second Division)
 Best home attacking record: 3
 1929–30 (Third Division South)
 1991–92 (Third Division)
 2001–02 (Second Division)
 Best away attacking record: 4
 1932–33 (Third Division South)
 1982–83 (Third Division)
 1994–95 (Second Division)
 2005–06 (League One)
 Best overall defensive record: 2
1931–32 (Third Division South)
 1958–59 (Third Division)
 Best home defensive record: 2
 1929–30 (Third Division South)
 2001–02 (Second Division)
 Best away defensive record: 4
 1931–32 (Third Division South)
 1932–33 (Third Division South)
 1958–59 (Third Division)
 1996–97 (Second Division)
 Highest overall goal difference: 3
 1932–33 (Third Division South)
 1991–92 (Third Division)
 2001–02 (Second Division)
 Highest home goal difference: 2
 1929–30 (Third Division South)
 2001–02 (Second Division)
 Highest away goal difference: 5
 1932–33 (Third Division South)
 1991–92 (Third Division)
 1994–95 (Second Division)
 1996–97 (Second Division)
 2005–06 (League One)
 Highest average attendance in division: 1
 13,300 (1932–33, Third Division South)

Worst in division 
 Worst away record: 2
1924–25 (Third Division South)
 2006–07 (League One)
 Worst overall attacking record: 2
 1960–61 (Third Division)
 2006–07 (League One)
 Worst away attacking record: 1
 1960–61 (Third Division)
 Worst overall defensive record: 3
 1924–25 (Third Division South)
 1925–26 (Third Division South)
 2006–07 (League One)
 Worst home defensive record: 1
 2006–07 (League One)
 Worst away defensive record: 1
 1924–25 (Third Division South)
 Lowest overall goal difference: 1
 2006–07 (League One)
 Lowest home goal difference: 1
 2006–07 (League One)

Football League fourth tier

Best in division 
 Best home record: 1
 1998–99 (Third Division)
 Best away record: 2
 1971–72 (Fourth Division)
 2008–09 (League Two)
 Best overall attacking record: 1
 1998–99 (Third Division)
 Best home attacking record: 1
 1998–99 (Third Division)
 Best home defensive record: 1
 2008–09 (League Two)
 Highest overall goal difference: 2
 1971–72 (Fourth Division)
 2008–09 (League Two)
 Highest home goal difference: 1
 1998–99 (Third Division)
 Highest away goal difference: 3
 1962–93 (Fourth Division)
 1971–72 (Fourth Division)
 2008–09 (League Two)
 Highest average attendance in division: 1
 11,738 (1971–72, Fourth Division)

National records

All-time 
 Most home Football League wins in a season: 21 (1929–30, Third Division South)
 Joint-highest aggregate score in a single Football League Cup match: 12 (6–6 after extra time versus Dagenham & Redbridge, first round, 13 August 2014)
 Highest-scoring draw in a single Football League Cup match: 6–6 (versus Dagenham & Redbridge, first round, 13 August 2014)
 Quickest golden goal: 15 seconds – Robert Taylor versus Barnet (Football League Trophy second round, 7 January 1997)
 Most Football League play-off campaigns without a promotion – 9 (1991, 1995, 1997, 2002, 2005, 2006, 2012, 2015, 2020)

Firsts 
 First club to win each of the Football League Second, Third and Fourth Division championships
 First club to occupy first place in the Football League First Division and last place in the Football League Fourth Division
 First occasion on which a Football League fourth-tier match was postponed due to international call-ups: versus Plymouth Argyle, Third Division, 10 September 1998 (Danny Boxall, Tony Folan, Hermann Hreiðarsson)
First loan player to feature as an ever-present through a season: Steve Sherwood (Fourth Division, 1974–75)
 First fourth substitute to score after entering the field in a competitive match: Justin Shaibu (versus AFC Wimbledon, Football League Cup first round, 8 August 2017)
First club to score its first 10 Premier League goals by 10 different players in its debut Premier League season: Sergi Canós, Rico Henry, Vitaly Janelt, Christian Nørgaard, Ethan Pinnock, Ivan Toney, Yoane Wissa, Zanka, Bryan Mbeumo (2021–22)

One-time 
 Joint-highest number of Football League wins in 2013 calendar year: 24
Most wins in League football (including playoffs) in 2020 calendar year: 24
 Most home Football League wins in the 2013–14 season: 19
Most League Cup matches played before reaching a quarter-final: 153
 Best home record in the Football League in 2014 calendar year
Only club in top four divisions with two players scoring 20 or more Football League goals in a season – 2
1977–78, Fourth Division – Steve Phillips (32), Andrew McCulloch (22)
1994–95, Second Division – Nicky Forster (24), Robert Taylor (23)
Highest away attendance in all competitions in 2018 calendar year: 8,500 (versus Arsenal, Football League Cup third round, 26 September 2018)
Football League Championship record outgoing transfer fee:
Neal Maupay (transferred to Brighton & Hove Albion for a reported £20,000,000 fee, 5 August 2019)
Ollie Watkins (transferred to Aston Villa for a reported £28,000,000 fee, 9 September 2020)
 English record transfer fee for a teenager: Peter Broadbent (transferred to Wolverhampton Wanderers for a £10,000 fee, February 1951)
Most Football League Championship league and playoff goals scored by substitutes during the 2020–21 season: 12
Most EFL Championship goals scored in a season: 31 – Ivan Toney (2020–21)

Wartime football

Club honours and best performances

Leagues 
London Combination
 Winners: 1918–19
Football League South
 Best performance: 3rd – 1944–45

London League

 Best performance: 9th – 1941–42

Cups 
London War Cup
 Winners: 1941–42
London Victory Cup
 Best performance: Second round – 1918–19

Football League War Cup
 Best performance: Second round – 1940–41

Football League South War Cup
 Best performance: Group Stage – 1942–43

War Cup Winners' Match

 Drawn: 1941–42

Player records

Most appearances 

 Numbers in brackets indicate goals scored. Years are listed according to the player's first and last wartime appearances for the club. Appearances made and goals scored in the 1939–40 Football League and 1945–46 FA Cup are not counted.

Top goalscorers 

 Numbers in brackets indicate goals scored. Years are listed according to the player's first and last wartime appearances for the club. Appearances made and goals scored in the 1939–40 Football League and 1945–46 FA Cup are not counted.

Other player records 
 1939–40 Football League and 1945–46 FA Cup statistics are not counted.
 Most appearances in a season (all competitions): 39
 Patsy Hendren (1916–17)
Joe James (1940–41)
Buster Brown (1941–42)
 Most goals in a season (all competitions): 31 – Len Townsend (1944–45)
 Most goals in a match (all competitions): 6 – Len Townsend (versus Brighton & Hove Albion, Football League South, 12 September 1942)
 Most hat-tricks (all competitions): 8 – Len Townsend
 Most hat-tricks in a season (all competitions): 4 – Len Townsend (1944–45)
 Most penalties in a season: 8 – Duncan McKenzie
 Most penalties in a season (all competitions): 4 – Duncan McKenzie (1940–41)

Club records 
 1939–40 Football League and 1945–46 FA Cup statistics are not counted.
 Record win (all competitions): 8–0 versus Brighton & Hove Albion, Football League South War Cup, 4 March 1944
 Highest-scoring draw (all competitions): 4–4
4–4 versus Watford, Football League South, 22 January 1944
4–4 versus Reading, Football League South, 25 November 1944
4–4 versus Chelsea, Football League South, 1 December 1945
 Record loss (all competitions): 7–0 versus Queens Park Rangers, Football League South Group B, 30 December 1939
 Most wins in a season (all competitions): 21 – 1918–19
 Most draws in a season (all competitions): 10
1915–16
1940–41
1945–46
 Most losses in a season (all competitions): 24 – 1916–17
Most goals scored in a season (all competitions): 102 – 1941–42
Most goals conceded in a season (all competitions): 99 – 1916–17
Fewest goals scored in a season (all competitions): 56 – 1916–17
Fewest goals conceded in a season (all competitions): 49 – 1918–19
Most clean sheets kept in a season (all competitions): 10 – 1943–44
Fewest clean sheets kept in a season (all competitions): 3
1940–41
1941–42
1942–43
 Highest home attendance (all competitions): 28,170 versus Chelsea (Football League South, 1 December 1945)

Awards

Club 
 Football League Awards
 Community Club of the Year (2): 2005–06, 2013–14
 League Two Community Club of the Year (1): 2008–09
 Best Club Sponsorship (1): 2006–07
 Family Excellence Award (8): 2007–08, 2009–10, 2010–11, 2011–12, 2012–13, 2013–14, 2014–15, 2015–16
 Stadium Business Awards
 Sponsorship, Sales and Marketing: 2013
 Littlewoods Giant Killers Award
 2–1 vs Norwich City, FA Cup third round, 6 January 1996

Managers

Players

Player of the Year 
 Gallaghers Divisional Footballer of the Year:
 John O'Mara (1971–72, Fourth Division)
 PFA Fans' Player of the Year:
 Jordan Rhodes (2008–09, League Two)
 Football League Player of the Year:
 Adam Forshaw (2013–14, League One)
 Ollie Watkins (2019–20, Championship)
 London Football Awards:
EFL Player of the Year
Neal Maupay (2018–19)
Ollie Watkins (2019–20)
Ivan Toney (2020–21)
Goalkeeper Of the Year: Daniel Bentley (2017–18)

Team of the Year 
 PFA Team of the Year: 
 Level 2
Alex Pritchard (2014–15, Championship)
 Alan Judge (2015–16, Championship)
 Saïd Benrahma, Ollie Watkins (2019–20, Championship)
Rico Henry, Ethan Pinnock, Ivan Toney (2020–21, Championship)
 Level 3
 Roger Joseph (1987–88, Third Division)
 Terry Evans, Dean Holdsworth (1991–92, Third Division)
 Nicky Forster (1994–95, Second Division)
 Carl Asaba (1996–97, Second Division)
 Paul Evans (2001–02, Second Division)
 Sam Sodje (2005–06, League One)
 Jake Bidwell, Adam Forshaw (2013–14, League One)
 Level 4
 Paul Evans, Hermann Hreiðarsson (1998–99, Third Division)
 Craig Pead (2007–08, League Two)
 Football League Team of the Year:
 Level 2
 Alan Judge (2015–16, Championship)
Ivan Toney (2020–21, Championship)
 Level 3
 Paul Evans, Lloyd Owusu (2001–02, Second Division)
 Adam Forshaw, Alan McCormack (2013–14, League One)
 Football League Team of the Year (calendar year):
John Egan (2016)

Player of the Month 
 Football League Player of the Month: 
 Level 2
Andre Gray (November 2014, Championship)
 Alan Judge (October 2015, Championship)
 Scott Hogan (September 2016, Championship)
 Saïd Benrahma (July 2020, Championship)
Ivan Toney (October 2020, Championship)
 Level 3
DJ Campbell (January 2006, League One)
 Sam Saunders (December 2013, League One)
 Level 4
 Marcus Bean (December 2008, League Two)
 Charlie MacDonald (February 2009, League Two)
 Football League Young Player of the Month
 Jake Bidwell (January 2014, League One)
PFA Fans' Player of the Month:
 Jordan Rhodes (March 2009, League Two)
Saïd Benrahma (January 2020, Championship)
 Evening Standard Player of the Month:
Jimmy Bloomfield
 Steve Phillips (March 1978, Fourth Division)
 Gary Roberts
 Terry Evans (January 1989, Third Division)
 Gary Blissett (February 1989, Third Division)
 Dean Holdsworth
 Jamie Bates (December 1997, Second Division)
 Sam Sodje (February 2005, League One)

Team of the Tournament 

 EFL Cup Team of the Tournament:
 Luke Daniels (2020–21)
 Marcus Forss, Saman Ghoddos (2021–22)

Team of the Round 

 FA Cup Team of the Round: Bryan Mbeumo (2021–22, third round)
 EFL Cup Team of the Round:
Luke Daniels, Josh Dasilva (2020–21, quarter-final)
Marcus Forss, Charlie Goode, Yoane Wissa (2021–22, third round)
Ivan Toney (2021–22, fourth round)

Player of the Round 
 FA Cup Player of the Round: Leon Legge (2009–10, second round)

Goal of the Tournament 

 EFL Cup Goal of the Tournament: Yoane Wissa (2021–22)

Goal of the Round 

 FA Cup Goal of the Round: Isaiah Rankin (2004–05, fifth round)
 EFL Cup Goal of the Round:
 Emiliano Marcondes (2020–21, third round)
 Saïd Benrahma (2020–21, fourth round)
 Yoane Wissa (2021–22, third round)

Goal of the Month 

 Premier League Goal of the Month: Ivan Toney (September 2022)
 Championship Goal of the Month:
 Saïd Benrahma (February 2019)
 Ollie Watkins (February 2020)

Other awards 
 Adidas Golden Boot: Steve Phillips (1977–78, Fourth Division)
 Canon League Loyalty Award: Eddie Lyons
 Puma Golden Glove: Ben Hamer (2008–09, League Two)
 EFL Sir Tim Finney Award: Kevin O'Connor
EFL Championship Golden Boot: Ivan Toney (2020–21)
 EFL Championship Golden Glove: David Raya (2019–20, shared)

Notes

References 

Brentford
Records And Statistics
Records And Statistics